"It's All Over Now" is a song written by Bobby Womack and his sister-in-law Shirley Womack. It was first released by The Valentinos, featuring Bobby Womack, in 1964. The Rolling Stones heard it on its release and quickly recorded a cover version, which became their first number-one hit in the United Kingdom, in July 1964.

The Valentinos version
The Valentinos recorded the song at United Recording in Hollywood on March 24, 1964, and released it two months later. It entered the Billboard Hot 100 on June 27, 1964, and stayed on the chart for two weeks, peaking at number 94.

Personnel
Bobby Womack – lead vocals, guitar, co-writer
Cecil Womack – background vocals
Harry Womack – background vocals
Friendly Womack Jr. – background vocals
Curtis Womack – background vocals
Sam Cooke – producer

The Rolling Stones version

The Rolling Stones landed in New York on June 1, 1964, for their first North American tour, around the time the Valentinos' recording was released. New York radio DJ Murray the K played the song to the Rolling Stones. He also played the Stones' "King Bee" (their Slim Harpo cover) the same night and remarked on their ability to achieve an authentic blues sound. After hearing "It's All Over Now" by the Womack Brothers (aka the Valentinos) on the WINS show, the band recorded their version nine days later at Chess Studios in Chicago. Years later, Bobby Womack said in an interview that he had told Sam Cooke he did not want the Rolling Stones to record their version of the song, and that he had told Mick Jagger to get his own song. Cooke convinced him to let the Rolling Stones record the song. Six months later on, after receiving the royalty check for the song, Womack told Cooke that Mick Jagger could have any song he wanted.

The Rolling Stones' version of "It's All Over Now" is the most famous version of the song. It was first released as a single in the UK, where it peaked at number 1 on the UK Singles Chart, giving the Rolling Stones their first number one hit. It was the band's third single released in America, and stayed in the Billboard Hot 100 for ten weeks, peaking at number 26. Months later it appeared on their second American album 12 X 5. The song was a big hit in Europe and was part of the band's live set in the 1960s.  Cash Box described it as a "contagious cover of the Valentinos' click" and "an infectious thumper that should head right for chartsville."

In his 2010 autobiography, Life, Keith Richards says that John Lennon criticized his guitar solo on this song and Richards agreed that it was not one of his best.

In 1964 Bill Wyman said, "We just liked the sound of it. We didn't think it sounded country and western until we read it somewhere. It's the 12-string guitar and harmonising that do it. Every one of our records has been different. We don't want to do the same old thing every time or people will get fed up with it."

Personnel
 Mick Jagger – lead vocals 
 Keith Richards – electric lead guitar, backing vocals
 Brian Jones – 12-string electric rhythm guitar, backing vocals
 Bill Wyman – bass 
 Charlie Watts – drums
 Ian Stewart – piano

Charts

Other versions
Johnny Rivers on In Action
Waylon Jennings on The One and Only
Stack Waddy on Bugger Off!
Bobby Womack and Bill Withers on Womack's I Don't Know What the World Is Coming To
Ducks Deluxe, eponymous release 1974 (RCA)
Rod Stewart on Gasoline Alley (1970); live version recorded for MTV Unplugged in 1993 appears on the single "Reason to Believe"
The Chambers Brothers on People Get Ready (1966)
Alex Taylor on With Friends and Neighbors
Jo Jo Zep & The Falcons on So Young (1978)
Molly Hatchet on Flirtin' with Disaster (1979)
John Anderson on the 1985 album Tokyo, Oklahoma.  His version peaked at #15 on the Billboard Hot Country Singles & Tracks chart.
In 1989 by The Dirty Dozen Brass Band on Voodoo, featuring Dr. John on vocals and piano
Rebirth Brass Band, on the 1999 album The Main Event: Live at the Maple Leaf
Feargal Sharkey on his self-titled debut album
Social Distortion on Japanese edition of their self-titled album
Nils Lofgren on Wonderland
Ry Cooder on Paradise and Lunch
Crveni Koralji on Otiđi od nje
Tunel on Do poslednje kapi...
Johnny Winter on Captured Live! as many times since 1974 (in about 268 concerts)
In the 1978 live recording by the Ozark Mountain Daredevils titled, It's Alive, recorded at Western Illinois University in Macomb, Illinois.
Amy Correia covers the Rod Stewart "medley" of Gasoline Alley/It's All Over Now on "THE I-10 CHRONICLES 2" (2001)
Jerusalem (British band) covers the song on their most recent LP Black Horses (2014)
Grateful Dead performed the song live 154 times since 1969
Widespread Panic performed the song live 7 times Link to Everyday Companion for every time played
Brinsley Schwarz on It's All Over Now (recorded 1974, officially released 2017)
Tom Petty & the Heartbreakers on Live at the Fillmore (recorded 1997, officially released 2022)
 In the 1980s a parody of the song was used to promote the Insignia men's toiletries range of deodorants, shampoo and after-shave.

See also
List of number-one singles from the 1960s (UK)
 Official lyric video to the Rolling Stones' version: The Rolling Stones - It's All Over Now (Official Lyric Video)

References

Decca Records singles
London Records singles
1964 singles
1985 singles
Bobby Womack songs
The Rolling Stones songs
Sam Cooke songs
Rod Stewart songs
Ry Cooder songs
Feargal Sharkey songs
Southside Johnny & The Asbury Jukes songs
John Anderson (musician) songs
UK Singles Chart number-one singles
Songs written by Bobby Womack
Song recordings produced by Andrew Loog Oldham
Warner Records singles
1964 songs